The 1988–89 season saw Hibernian compete in the Scottish Premier Division, in which they finished 5th. They also competed in the Scottish Cup, where they reached the semi-finals, and the Scottish League Cup, where they were eliminated in the fourth round.

Scottish Premier Division

Final League table

Scottish League Cup

Scottish Cup

See also
List of Hibernian F.C. seasons

References

External links
Hibernian 1988/1989 results and fixtures, Soccerbase

Hibernian F.C. seasons
Hibernian